Lyndon is a home rule-class city in Jefferson County, Kentucky, United States. The population was 11,002 at the 2010 census, up from 9,369 at the 2000 census.

Incorporated on May 10, 1965, Lyndon became part of the new Louisville Metro government in 2003. It remains an independent city with its own mayor and emergency services and is not counted in Louisville's population although its citizens can vote for the mayor of Louisville and Metro Council members.

History

The area is the home of Oxmoor Farm, the residence of Alexander Scott Bullitt, one of the drafters of Kentucky's first constitution.

At some point after 1865, the L&N offered local landowner Alvin Wood connection to their network provided that he pay the costs of constructing the station and donate the land for the spur. He did so, and in 1871 the Lyndon depot began service. The town's etymology remains uncertain, although some connect it to Linn's Station and others to explorer William Linn.

The Bellevoir-Ormsby Village was built in 1867 and Kentucky Military Institute moved to the town in 1896. Central State Hospital is also near Lyndon.

In 1963, Lyndon's post office was subsumed by the Louisville system. Lyndon was incorporated soon after in order to avoid annexation by the neighboring city of St. Matthews.

Geography
Lyndon is located in northeastern Jefferson County at  (38.264521, -85.591223). Nearby Louisville suburbs include Graymoor-Devondale to the northwest, St. Matthews to the southwest, Hurstbourne to the south, and Anchorage to the east. U.S. Route 60 (Shelbyville Road) forms part of the southern boundary of Lyndon.

Demographics
At the 2010 census, there were 11,002 people, 5,374 households and 2,585 families residing in the city.  The racial makeup of the city was 80.4% White, 11.4% African American, 0.2% Native American, 2.1% Asian, 0.00% Pacific Islander, 3.3% from other races, and 2.6% from two or more races. Hispanic or Latino of any race were 6.9% of the population.

There were 5,374 households, of which 22.9% had children under the age of 18 living with them, 32.9% were married couples living together, 11.2% had a female householder with no husband present, and 51.9% were non-families. 41.4% of all households were made up of individuals, and 7.2% and 2.8% had female or male individuals over the age of 65 years of age or older living alone respectively. The average household size was 2.02 and the average family size was 2.79.

20% of the population were under the age of 18, 9.4% from 20 to 24, 34.1% from 25 to 44, 22.2% from 45 to 64, and 12.4% who were 65 years of age or older. The median age was 33 years. For every 100 females, there were 95.6 males. For every 100 females age 18 and over, there were 91.5 males.

At the 2017 American Community Survey estimate, the median household income was $52,431 and the median family income was $71,025. Males had a median income of $47,719 and females $45,656.  The per capita income $34,183. About 2.7% of families and 6.8% of the population were below the poverty line, including 4.1% of those under age 18 and 0.6% of those age 65 or over.

According to the 2022 US census, the current population is 10,928. This is a 0.7% decrease from the 2020 census.

Robsion Park

The 17 acre park is located in the middle of Lyndon, between Lake Avenue and LaGrange Road. It has benches, picnic tables, a pavilion, two age appropriate playgrounds, a new splash pad, and a 3/8 mile walking trail. The park is named for John M. Robsion Jr. who donated the land in 1985.

Economy
Kroger's Mid-South offices are in Lyndon.
UPS Air Group
Westport Village Shopping Complex

Gallery

References

Further reading
 Kentucky Historical Society. Historical Marker 1474
 Lyndon Homemaker's Club, "Lyndon Lore", 1972, subheading 'Pioneer Stations'.

External links
City of Lyndon — official website
Northeast Regional Library — official website
Northeast Regional Library, Opened In Lyndon — Louisville.gov, June 24, 2019
"Lyndon: Train Tracks Were the Ties that Bound a Community of Commuters in Early 1900s",  Kay Stewart, The Courier-Journal
Robison Park — Video 

Cities in Kentucky
Cities in Jefferson County, Kentucky
Louisville metropolitan area